Joseph Michael "Joey" Stivic is a fictional character who first appeared on the 1970s American sitcom All in the Family. Joey Stivic was the son and only child of Mike Stivic (played by Rob Reiner) and Gloria Stivic (played by Sally Struthers), and the grandson of Archie Bunker (Carroll O'Connor) and Edith Bunker (Jean Stapleton). The character first appeared as a newborn baby in a two-part episode of All in the Family that aired in December 1975.

After many appearances on All in the Family until Reiner and Struthers left the series in 1978 (by that time, Joey had been played most often by alternating twins Jason and Justin Draeger), the Joey Stivic character next appeared in the All in the Family spin-off series (some call it a continuation of the original) Archie Bunker's Place, in a guest appearance in the November 1979 episode "Thanksgiving Reunion". (Played by three-year-old Cory R. Miller, the character also appeared in the two-part December 1978 All in the Family episode "California, Here We Are," after Reiner and Struthers were no longer series regulars.) On Archie Bunker's Place, the character was played by child actor Dick Billingsley and was appropriately pre-school age.  With Gloria now separated from Mike, she returned to Archie Bunker's Place with Joey in the February 1982 episode "Gloria Comes Home". In this episode, Joey was played by Christopher Johnston.
 
Joey Stivic was a regular character on the All in the Family spin-off series Gloria in 1982 and 1983. On this series, in which the now-divorced Gloria Bunker character had moved to Upstate New York in order to work as an assistant veterinarian, the part of Joey Stivic was played by ten-year-old actor Christian Jacobs. After Gloria was canceled in 1983, Joey Stivic disappeared from prime time television for 11 years, until the character made one last appearance on
704 Hauser, a short-lived 1994 series about a black family who had moved into the old Bunker home, years after Bunker had sold it. In this appearance, the Joey Stivic character was played by Casey Siemaszko, an actor born in 1961 (14 years before Joey Stivic's fictional birth).

Doll
In 1976, the Ideal Toy Company released a 14-inch "Joey Stivic doll" (called "Archie Bunker's Grandson"), which was billed as the "first anatomically correct male doll". The doll inspired mild controversy at the time, and is a collectors' item today.

References

External links
Information on the Joey Stivic doll
X-Entertainment article discussing Joey Stivic doll

All in the Family characters
Doll brands
Fictional characters from Queens, New York
Television characters introduced in 1975